Chak # 285 GB (Muhammadabad, Urdu:محمد آباد) is a large village of tehsil & District Toba Tek Singh, Punjab, Pakistan. It is a part of Union Council Number 42, along with closest villages, Chak No. 286 GB, Chak No. 284 GB. Chak No. 291 GB. A Karachi - Lahore Motorway M3 goes through this village and an Interchange has been built in Rajana. These all villages are on Gugera Branch Canal, which comes from River Chennab near Khanki, Hafizabad and again join another canal from same river Chennab  near Shorkot Cant. The postal code is 36071. Punjabi is the native spoken language but as a national language Urdu is also widely used. Major castes of this village are Arain, Syed, Gujjar, Rajputs, Khokhar, etc.

Location 
It is located near Rajana which is at the road crossing junction of Faisalabad-Pirmahal and Toba-Chichawatni, approximately 96 km south from Faisalabad and 28 km northwest of Chichawatni-Toba Take Singh Road. Just across the village boundary there is a hand-planted forest which served as wood supply for British during British raj for decades. This is one of the largest hand-planted forest in Pakistan. There is also a small zoo having different birds and animals. Its major crops are Wheat, Cotton, Sugarcane, Corn, Rice etc.

Climate

It is not a typical "Hilly & Chilly" type of climate in Chak No. 285 GB, as it is closer to the plains. During winter, the climate is cold but pleasant when woollens are required. During summer the temperature is hot and cottons are recommended. Temperature does sometimes cross the 44 degree °C mark in summers.

Education 

The village has two schools, one for boys and one for girls, providing education up to 5th class. Nearest Government Degree College is located at Rajana. For University education of boys and girls, students have to seek admission in University at Toba Take Singh or Faisalabad. Existing schools at the village are:

 Government Primary School for Boys
 Government Primary School for Girls

Sports
Cricket is the most common sports played in the village and a multipurpose Ground from Local school is dedicated for local players. Village teams regularly take part in local tournaments and derbies. Most Notable sports figures are Mohsin Javed, Mirza Afzal, Raja Ajzal, Raja Mani aka Raja Kutty Wala, Adnan Arif aka Peer Daany Ali Shah. Kabaddi, Football, Hockey, Gulli Danda and cockfighting are the other famous sports played in the village but with not much dedication as cricket. Talha Fakeer is the most prominent figure in Cockfighting.

References 

 List of districts of Pakistan by Human Development Index
 Tehsils & Unions in the District of Toba Tek Singh – Government of Pakistan
 Pakistan Post Codes
 District Pre-Investment Study - 2012 Toba Tek Singh 
 Punjab Health Sector Reforms Programme

External links 

 Major Crops of Pakistan
 Weather in Rajana - Weather Forecast for Punjab Pakistan

Union councils of Toba Tek Singh District